Courtney Clements (born November 12, 1989) is a professional basketball player. She played college basketball at the University of Arizona and San Diego State University. She played in the WNBA for the Chicago Sky however, she got waived in 2015.

San Diego State statistics

Source

References

1989 births
Living people
Arizona Wildcats women's basketball players
Atlanta Dream players
Chicago Sky players
Los Angeles Sparks players
San Diego State Aztecs women's basketball players
Sportspeople from Santa Ana, California
Guards (basketball)